Willard Varnell Oliver (May 2, 1921 – October 14, 2009) was an American veteran of the United States Marine Corps and a member of the Navajo Code Talkers during World War II. Oliver was part of a unit of Navajos who worked to confuse Japanese forces in the Pacific during World War II through the transmission of messages in the Navajo language. His younger brother, Lloyd Oliver, was also a member of the Navajo Code Talkers.  Their parents were Howard and Olive (Lee) Oliver.

Oliver grew up in a rural area between Shiprock and Farmington, New Mexico and graduated from the Shiprock Agricultural High School in 1940. He enlisted in the United States Marine Corps on March 23, 1943, and served with the 2nd Marine Division. He was honorably discharged on December 11, 1945.

Willard Oliver died on October 14, 2009, at the  Northern Arizona Veterans Affairs Health Care System Hospital in Prescott, Arizona, at the age of 88. He was the fifth member of the Navajo Code Talkers to die since May 2009.

Navajo President Joe Shirley Jr. ordered that American flags on the Navajo Nation be lowered to half staff in Oliver's honor. His funeral was held on October 17, 2009, in his hometown of Lukachukai, Arizona.

References

External links
 Willard Oliver – Daily Telegraph obituary

1921 births
2009 deaths
Navajo code talkers
United States Marine Corps personnel of World War II
People from Apache County, Arizona
People from San Juan County, New Mexico
Military personnel from New Mexico
20th-century Native Americans
21st-century Native Americans